Malojian is the musical solo project of Stevie Scullion, a Northern Irish singer-songwriter and founder of independent record label Style Records.

Biography 
2012's The Deer's Cry was recorded in Start Together Studios, Oh Yeah Music Centre, Belfast, The Freak Farm, Dromore and Millband Studio, Lisburn.  It received critical acclaim upon release and featured on BBC Radio 2 Bob Harris Sunday, where Malojian played a live set, to which Harris stated, "I love your music"

2015's Southlands was recorded at Millbank Studios, Lisburn and Malojian played at set on BBC Radio 6 Cerys Matthews show The single "Communion Girls" received extensive airtime on Irish and UK radio stations featuring on BBC Radio 6 Music, BBC Radio  Scotland Ricky Ross, RTE Radio and BBC Radio Ulster amongst others 

2016's This Is Nowhere was recorded at Electrical Audio by Steve Albini and a documentary filmed by photographer Colm Laverty, Document: a Film About Malojian was released on YouTube and follows the recording of the album.

2017's Let Your Weirdness Carry You Home, partly recorded in Rathlin Island East Lighthouse and 2020's Humm, features Joey Waronker (Beck, R.E.M., Roger Waters, Atoms For Peace) on drums and percussion, Gerry Love (Teenage Fanclub) on bass and Jon Thorne (Yorkston, Thorne & Khan; Lamb). 

2020's Humm was partly co-written and co-produced with Jason Lytle of Grandaddy. Lytle and Scullion previously completed a UK and Irish collaborative tour in the summer of 2019. Collaborating over the internet with Lytle, bouncing ideas back and forth, the album title refers to the transatlantic cable on Foilhummeran Bay on Valentia Island off the coast of Ireland.

Southlands, This Is Nowhere, Let Your Weirdness Carry You Home, and Humm were short-listed for the Northern Ireland Music Prize Album of the Year.

Members 
 Stevie Scullion – guitar, piano, vocals
 Chris McCorry – vocals, bass, keyboards, guitar
 Andrew Murray – vocals, guitar

Discography

Studio albums 
 The Deer's Cry (2012)
 Southlands (Twenty30, 2015) 
 This is Nowhere (Rollercoaster Records, 2016) 
 Let Your Weirdness Carry You Home (Rollercoaster Records, 2017) 
 humm (Style Records, 2020)

EPs 
 The Broken Deer EP (self-released, 2012)
 The Simple Life EP (self-released, 2013)

Singles 
 "Communion Girls" (2015)
 "Ambulance Song / Beardness" (2018)

References

External links 
  at Bandcamp

Year of birth missing (living people)
Living people
Irish male singer-songwriters